The Ministry of Welfare is a part of the Icelandic Government. As of November 2017, there are two ministers heading the Ministry of Welfare: Ásmundur Einar Daðason, Minister of Social Affairs and Equality, and Svandís Svavarsdóttir, Minister of Health.

List of ministers

Minister of Welfare (1 January 2011 – 23 May 2013)

Minister of Social Affairs and Equality (23 May 2013 – present)

Minister of Health (23 May 2013 – present)

References

External links
Official website 
Official website 

Welfare
Social affairs ministers